Maurice Joseph Dunne (born 19 June 1947) was a Scottish footballer who played for Dumbarton and Clydebank.

References

1947 births
Scottish footballers
Dumbarton F.C. players
Clydebank F.C. (1965) players
Scottish Football League players
Living people
Association football forwards